Bidhannagar Govt. High School, or BNGHS, is an educational institution in Kolkata, West Bengal, India. It is situated in BD block in Salt lake and hence also popularly referred as BD School. It is the first government co-educational senior secondary school established in West Bengal. The medium of teaching is Bengali and English. The school is affiliated to West Bengal Board of Secondary Education and West Bengal Council of Higher Secondary Education.

High schools and secondary schools in Kolkata
Educational institutions established in 1977
1977 establishments in West Bengal